Sir Henry David Alastair Capel Miers  (born 10 January 1937), commonly known as Sir David Miers, is a British retired ambassador.

Career
Miers was educated at Winchester College and University College, Oxford. He did National Service as an officer in the Queen's Own Cameron Highlanders, commissioning into the regiment in 1956. He joined Her Majesty's Diplomatic Service in 1961 and held appointments in Japan, Laos, France, Iran and at the Foreign Office in London, before becoming Ambassador to Lebanon in 1983. He served in that position until 1985. In 1989 he was made Ambassador to Greece, before serving as Ambassador to the Netherlands between 1993 and 1996. Miers was invested as a Companion of the Order of St Michael and St George in 1979 and as a Knight Commander of the Order of the British Empire in 1985.

References

External links
Interview with Sir David Miers, British Diplomatic Oral History Programme, Churchill College, Cambridge, 2014

1937 births
Living people
People educated at Winchester College
Alumni of University College, Oxford
Queen's Own Cameron Highlanders officers
Companions of the Order of St Michael and St George
Knights Commander of the Order of the British Empire
Ambassadors of the United Kingdom to Greece
Ambassadors of the United Kingdom to Lebanon
Ambassadors of the United Kingdom to the Netherlands